The 1970 Campeonato Brasileiro Série A (officially the 1970 Torneio Roberto Gomes Pedrosa) was the 14th edition of the Campeonato Brasileiro Série A. It began on September 20 and ended on December 20. Palmeiras came as the defending champion having won the 1969 season and Fluminense won the championship, the first in the history of the club.

Championship format

First-phase: the 17 participants play all against all twice, but divided into two groups (one 8 and one 9) for classification, in the Group A, each team plays two more matches against any other. The first 2 of each group are classified for the finals.
Final-phase: the four clubs classified play all against all in a single round. The club with most points at this stage is the champion.
Tie-breaking criteria:
1 - Goal difference2 - Raffle

With one victory, a team still gained 2 points, instead of 3.

First phase

Group A

Group B

Final phase

Matches:

References
 1970 Campeonato Brasileiro Série A at RSSSF

 

1970
1
Bra
B